Courtyard by Marriott is a brand of hotels owned by Marriott International. One of Marriott's mid-priced brands, the hotels are primarily targeted to business travelers, but also accommodate traveling families. Rooms have desks, couches, and free Internet access. The majority of locations have a bistro that sells fresh cooked and prepared breakfast (not complimentary), appetizers, sandwiches, and more.  All have 24-hour "markets." Premium upgrades are also offered, such as Enhanced Internet upgrades and larger "suite-style" rooms.

Courtyard's competitors in the mid-priced business-oriented hotel segment include Cambria Hotels & Suites, Wingate Inn, and Hilton Garden Inn.

History  

In the early 1980s, Marriott struggled to find locations that fitted the existing Marriott brand. To broaden selection, the company created Courtyard for business and pleasure travelers. The new brand focused on smaller properties in lower demand areas. The chain grew from three test sites in 1983 to over 90 hotels in 1987.
    
The first location was built in 1983 in San Luis and was Marriott's first sister brand. The chain primarily targeted business travelers, but over time has broadened to the leisure market. Most properties now offer a swimming pool or fitness center, microwaves and mini-fridges, and family rates. Many have a mini-fridge in every room, and generally have a complimentary guest microwave in The Market. Usually, microwaves are found in suite rooms.

Marriott International spent $2 billion in the mid-1980s on expanding the Courtyard by Marriott chain to attract the typical Holiday Inn clientele.

In 2007, Marriott adopted its Refreshing Business Initiative to update the Courtyard properties to better satisfy the business traveler. Renovations included a redesigned lobby, and a bar with extended hours, which not only offered a popular social setting, but also increased revenue.

In 2017, a Courtyard Marriott Hotel became the first American chain hotel to open on the Island of Bonaire, and through a partnership with local dive shop chain, Dive Friends Bonaire, became the first Courtyard hotel in the world to have an onsite scuba diving shop.

As of June 30, 2020, there were 1,254 Courtyard Marriott Hotels worldwide with 187,095 rooms in addition to 288 hotels with 49,335 rooms in the pipeline.

Accommodations

Historical

From 2015

Gallery

References

External links
  Courtyard website

Hotels established in 1983
Marriott International brands